The Sexual Freedom League (SFL) was an organization founded in 1963 in New York City by Jefferson Poland and Leo Koch. It existed under the name New York City League for Sexual Freedom to promote and conduct sexual activity among its members and to agitate for political reform, especially for the repeal of laws against abortion and censorship, and had many female leaders.

History

West coast formation 
When Jefferson Poland moved to the San Francisco Bay Area, he started the East Bay Sexual Freedom League there, near the University of California, Berkeley in 1966. Although Poland founded the League, he did not try to establish it as a conventional organization with membership lists, dues and meetings. Instead, he went around establishing various Leagues and allowing others to run them.

The League first made national news in August 1965 with the "Nude Wade-in" led by Poland, 23, Ina Saslow, 21, and Shirley Einseidel, 21, at Aquatic Park, a public beach in San Francisco. The SFL was featured in an article in Time magazine on March 11, 1966, which attracted thousands of curiosity seekers and a few active participants. In early 1966 Poland transferred the East Bay League to Richard Thorne, who proceeded to organize nude parties, which were thinly disguised sex orgies. Thorne fled to Mexico in the summer of 1966, later changed his name to Ohm and started a religion by that name.

Leaving the East Bay 

The Campus Sexual Freedom League disappeared when Sloan left town due to an arrest in April 1967. The last of its 28 nude parties took place on Christmas Eve of that year. By then the East Bay League had also folded and Alida Reyenga had moved to Los Angeles, where she took up Scientology.

While the East Bay versions were dying out, other chapters sprouted up all over California, and the San Francisco Sexual Freedom League emerged at the forefront. It was at first headed by Margo St. James, who claimed to be a "former prostitute" and participated in social activism while she organized sex orgies, then taken over by Frank and Margo Rila, with ongoing involvement of Jefferson Poland, and members such as Mother Boats. Frank, who edited the Sexual Freedom newspaper, eventually died by suicide.

Margo St. James ran for San Francisco Board of Supervisors many times but all without success. She has often been criticized by feminists such as Dorchen Leidholdt.

References

Cited texts

Other texts
 The Records of the San Francisco Sexual Freedom League by Jefferson F. Poland and Valerie Alison with preface by Herbert Gold, Olympia Press, 1971,

External links
Guide to the Sexual Freedom League records at The Bancroft Library
Finding Aid to the Sexual Freedom League Records, 1962-1983 (bulk 1964-1973)
Sexual Freedom Legal Defense and Education Fund, Inc.

Clothing free organizations
Freedom of expression in the United States
Organizations based in New York (state)
Sex positivism
University of California, Berkeley